Lutine was a frigate which served in both the French Navy and the Royal Navy. She was launched by the French in 1779. The ship passed to British control in 1793 and was taken into service as HMS Lutine. She sank among the West Frisian Islands during a storm in 1799.

She was built as a French  with 32 guns, and was launched at Toulon in 1779. During the French Revolution, Lutine came under French Royalist control. On 18 December 1793, she was one of sixteen ships handed over to a British fleet at the end of the Siege of Toulon, to prevent her being captured by the French Republicans. In 1795, she was rebuilt by the British as a fifth-rate frigate with 38 guns. She served thereafter in the North Sea, where she was part of the blockade of Amsterdam.

Lutine sank during a storm at Vlieland in the West Frisian Islands on 9 October 1799, whilst carrying a large shipment of gold. Shifting sandbanks disrupted salvage attempts, and the majority of the cargo has never been recovered. Lloyd's of London has preserved her salvaged bell – the Lutine Bell – which is now used for ceremonial purposes at their headquarters in London.

French career 
In 1780, Lutine was under Cambray, and called the ports of Foilleri, Smyrna and Malta, before returning to Toulon, escorting a convoy. Later that year, she was under Garnier de Saint-Antonin, conducting missions in the Eastern Mediterranean.

In 1781, she was under Flotte, also escorting convoys in the Eastern Mediterranean and calling Marseille, Malta, Smyrna and Foilleri. At Athens, Flotte was gifted an antique relief, that he reported to Navy Minister Castries. From 13 July 1782 to 16 July 1783, she continued the same missions under Gineste.

With the outbreak of the War of the First Coalition, Lutine was recommissioned as a bomb ship in 1792.

British career

On 27 September 1793, the royalists in Toulon surrendered the city, naval dockyards, arsenal, and French Mediterranean fleet to a British fleet commanded by Vice Admiral Lord Hood. The French vessels included: 

Lutine was one of the ships from the Old Basin. During the siege of Toulon, the British converted Lutine to a bomb vessel that fired mortars at the besieging French artillery batteries, which were under the command of Napoleon Bonaparte. When they abandoned Toulon on 19 December, the British took Lutine with them.

The ship was sent to Portsmouth in December 1793 for a refit and commissioned as HMS Lutine.

The loss of the Lutine occurred during the Second Coalition of the French Revolutionary Wars, in which an Anglo-Russian army landed in the Batavian Republic (now the Netherlands), which had been occupied by the French since 1795. (The French had captured the Dutch fleet the previous year in a cavalry charge over the frozen polders.) Admiral Duncan had heavily defeated the Dutch fleet in 1797 at the Battle of Camperdown and the remainder of the Dutch fleet was captured on 30 August 1799 by the Duke of York.

During this period Lutine served as an escort, guiding transports in and out of the shoal waters around North Holland.

In October 1799 under command of Captain Lancelot Skynner she was employed in carrying about £ in bullion and coin (equivalent in value to £ in ), from Yarmouth to Cuxhaven in order to provide Hamburg's banks with funds in order to prevent a stock market crash and, possibly, for paying troops in North Holland. In the evening of 9 October 1799, during a heavy northwesterly gale, the ship under Captain Lancelot Skynner, having made unexpected leeway, was drawn by the tidal stream flowing into the Waddenzee, onto a sandbank in Vlie off the island of Terschelling, in the West Frisian Islands. There, she became a total loss. All but one of her approximately 240 passengers and crew perished in the breaking seas.

Captain Portlock, commander of the British squadron at Vlieland, reported the loss, writing to the Admiralty in London on 10 October:

Three officers, including Captain Skynner, were apparently buried in the Vlieland churchyard, and around two hundred others were buried in a mass grave near the Brandaris lighthouse in Terschelling. No memorials mark these graves.

Captain Lancelot Skynner came from Easton on the Hill, near Stamford, England, where his father was rector for many years. Plaques on the former rectory (known for a time as Lutine House) and in the church commemorate this and Captain Skynner.

The failure of the gold to arrive precipitated the very crisis that it had been designed to prevent.

Legacy

Site of the wreck
The site of the wreck, the Vlie, was notorious for its strong currents and the danger of storms forcing ships onto the shore. The area is composed of sandbanks and shoals, which the currents continuously shift, with channels through them: in 1666, during the Second Anglo-Dutch War, Admiral Holmes had managed to penetrate these shoals and start Holmes's Bonfire, surprising the Dutch who had considered the shoals impassable. The depth of water also constantly changes, and this has caused much of the difficulty in salvage attempts.

Lutine was wrecked in a shallow channel called the IJzergat, which has now completely disappeared, between the islands of Vlieland and Terschelling. Immediately after Lutine sank, the wreck began silting up, forcing an end to salvage attempts by 1804. By chance, it was discovered in 1857 that the wreck was again uncovered, but covered again in 1859. The wreck was probably partially uncovered between 1915 and 1916, although no salvage was attempted because of World War I.

The gold
Lloyd's archives were destroyed by the fire at Lloyd's headquarters in 1838, and the amount of cargo lost is based on the estimate made by Lloyd's in 1858: £1.2 million, consisting of both silver and gold 60 years after the disaster. Only the general assessment of the cargo and the amount of insurance are known for sure.
The gold was insured by Lloyd's of London, which paid the claim in full. The underwriters therefore owned the gold under rights of abandonment and later authorised attempts to salvage it. However, because of the state of war, the Dutch also laid claim to it as a prize of war.

Captain Portlock was instructed by the Admiralty on 29 October 1799 to try to recover the cargo for the benefit of the persons to whom it belongs; Lloyd's also sent agents to look over the wreck. The Committee for the Public Properties of Holland instructed the local Receivers of Wrecks to report on the wreck, and F.P. Robbé, the Receiver on Terschelling, was authorised in December 1799 to begin salvage operations. All three parties had drawn attention to the difficulty of salvage due to the unfavourable position of the wreck and lateness of the year.

In 1821, Robbé's successor as Receiver at Terschelling, Pierre Eschauzier successfully petitioned King William I and by royal decree received the sole right  In return, the state would receive half of all recoveries. Eschauzier and his heirs therefore became the owners of the wreck by royal decree and thus are known as the 'Decretal Salvors'.

Eschauzier's attempts spurred Lloyd's to approach the British government to defend their rights to the wreck. In 1823, King William revised by subsequent decree the original decree: everything which "had been reserved to the state from the cargo of the above-mentioned frigate" was ceded to the King of Great Britain as a token "of our friendly sentiments towards the Kingdom of Great Britain, and by no means out of a conviction of England's right to any part of the aforementioned cargo." This share was subsequently ceded back to Lloyd's.

The gold was apparently stored in flimsy casks bound with weak iron hoops and the silver in casks with wooden hoops. Within a year of the wreck, these casks had largely disintegrated, and the sea had started to scatter and cover the wreck.

Lloyd's records were destroyed by fire in 1838, and the actual amount of the gold lost is now unknown. In 1858 Lloyd's estimated the total value at £, made up of both silver and gold. Despite extended operations, over 80% remains to be salvaged. An uncorroborated newspaper report in 1869 referred to the Dutch crown jewels being on board.

Initial salvage attempts 1799-1938
1799-1801: An 1876 account reports that fishermen-with the sanction of the Dutch government in return for two-thirds of the recovered salvage-for a year and a half prior to 1801 recovered £80,000 of Bullion consisting of 58 bars of gold; 35 bars of silver; 42,000 Spanish silver pistoles; 212 half-pistoles, 179 Spanish gold pistoles; with smaller quantities of quarter; eighth and sixteenth pistoles. A 1911 account reports that, besides the gold, silver and pistoles listed above, there was also recovered 41,697-not 42,000- Spanish Silver pistoles; 81 double Louis d'or; 138 single Louis d'or and 4 English guineas with an estimated value of £83,000 pounds sterling. The Dutch government's two-thirds share was re-minted into £56,000 worth of Dutch guilders. Sent to England was a packet of silver spoons initialled "W.S" and recognized as belonging to Lutines captain; likewise, a salvaged sword was identified as belonging to Lt. Charles Gustine Aufrere.

In August 1800 Robbé recovered a cask of seven gold bars, weighing  and a small chest containing 4,606 Spanish piastres. Over 4–5 September, two small casks were recovered, one with its bottom stoved in, yielding twelve gold bars. There were also other, more minor, recoveries, making this year the most successful of all the salvage attempts; however, the expenses of the salvage were still greater than the recoveries by 3,241 guilders.

In 1801, although recoveries were made, conditions were unfavourable and the wreck was already silted up. By 1804 Robbé reported: that the part of the wreck in which one is accustomed to find the precious metals has now been covered by a large piece of the side of the ship (which had previously been found hanging more or less at an angle), thus impeding the salvage work, which was otherwise possible. Salvage attempts appear to have been given up at this point.

In 1814, Pierre Eschauzier was allocated 300 guilders for salvage by the Dutch King and recovered "8 Louis d'or and 7 Spanish piastres fished out of the wreck of the Lutine".

In 1821, Eschauzier put together a syndicate with the intention of using a diving bell manned by amphibicque Englishmen. However, Mr. Rennie, the engineer died that year; in 1822, the diving bell arrived at the end of June, but operations were frustrated by bad weather and silting-up of the wreck; at this stage the wreck was reckoned to be  under the sand. Although salvage attempts continued until 1829, little was gained and the diving bell was sold on to the Dutch navy. In 1835, the sandbank covering Lutine shrank and moved southwards, with the depth of water being  and desultory attempts at salvage were made. Further attempts to raise capital were largely unsuccessful.

In 1857, it was discovered by chance that "a channel had formed straight across the Goudplaat sandbank, leading over the wreck, so that the latter was not merely clear of sand but had also sunk further below the surface with the channel [...] the bows and stern, together with the decks and sides, had come completely away, leaving only the keel with the keelson above it and some ribs attached to this". Recovery work immediately recommenced, now using helmeted divers (helmduikers) and bell divers (klokduikers), the latter using a bell called the Hollandsche Duiker ('Dutch diver'). However, a large number of unauthorised salvors also displayed an interest, which led the Dutch government to station a gunboat in the area. Over the course of the season approximately 20,000 guilders-worth of specie was recovered.

The 1858 season was hampered by poor weather but yielded 32 gold bars and 66 silver bars. This ship's bell was also discovered in this year (see below). In 1859 it became apparent that the treasure had been stored towards the stern of the ship, and that the stern was lying on its side, with the starboard side uppermost and the port side sunk into the sand. This area, however, only gave up 4 gold bars, 1 silver bar, and over 3,500 piastres.

In 1859 the rudder from the wreck was salvaged. This was transported to Lloyd's and used to make a desk and a chair for Lloyd's of London. These are still kept at Lloyd's and used on special occasions. On the table is a plaque of silver with the text:

The chair has a similar inscription.

Less known is that in addition to the table and chair, two ink sets are also made from the wood of the rudder. These feature lloyd's coat of arms and a silver plaque with the text:
Ink set made of lutine rudder with silver plaque
THIS INKSTAND is made of the RUDDER of LUTINE Frigate wrecked off the island of Vlieland Oct. 9. 1799. The Rudder was recovered in 1859 after being submerged 60 years

By 1860, the depth of the wreck had reached  and the quantity of salvage was declining. Nonetheless, over the four years salvage worth half a million guilders had been recovered: 41 gold bars, 64 silver bars, and 15,350 various coins, and the syndicate paid a 136% return; attempts were finally ended in 1863 as the wreck again silted up.

After 1860 to 1889 attempts at salvage are reported to have recovered 11,164 coins valued at $4,600.

In 1867, an inventor, Willem Hendrik ter Meulen, proposed using a 'zandboor' ('sand drill'), a device which forced water into the sandy sea bed in order to clear a way for a helmet diver and signed a three-year contract, subsequently extended for another three years and then a further twenty years. The plan was that when the depth of water reached , the machine would be used to excavate the same depth of sand down onto the wreck. Ter Meulen bought a steel-hulled, paddlewheel-driven 50 h.p. steam tug, Antagonist. The engine was modified such that it could be disconnected from the paddlewheels and used to drive the centrifugal 'whirlpool' pump. It was also found that the sand did not collapse once the diver descended through the drilled hole into the cavity excavated by the machine.

However, ter Meulen was responsible for re-establishing the landmarks used for taking transits of the wreck site and for establishing its position: .

In 1886 a cannon was salvaged and presented by Lloyd's to Queen Victoria: it is now on display at Windsor Castle. Another was offered to the City of London Corporation and is on display at the Guildhall, London. A final cannon was passed to the Lloyd's sports club in Essex. More are on display in Amsterdam's Stedelijk Museum, and at least four are in Terschelling. A number of coins and small relics were recovered to the value of £700.

In 1891 a few small coins were found, and in 1896 a cannon was presented to Queen Wilhelmina.

In 1898,  of timber was salvaged. This was donated to the Liverpool Underwriters' Association, whose chairman had it made into a chair. Where this chair is now is unknown.

In 1911 a Salvage Company was organized to salvage the reported treasure. In 1912 this effort is reported to have recovered silver coins, cannon, cannonballs, grapeshot and an anchor but no treasure.

In 1913 the two bower anchors, carried at the ship's bow, each weighing  were recovered and put on display in Amsterdam. Consideration was given by Lloyd's to setting the anchors up as a monument behind the Royal Exchange in place of a statue to Sir Robert Peel, but this was not carried out and only the wooden stocks, marked Lutine were forwarded to Lloyd's. Reportedly the outbreak of World War I prevented another salvage attempt.

In 1933 an attempt was made to salvage the reported treasure, but was stopped when the salvage bell was wrecked by a World War I naval mine. This was followed by a further unsuccessful attempt in 1934.

In 1938, yet another attempt was made to salvage the reported treasure. During this attempt, the largest dredger in the world (75 metres long, 23 metres wide), Karimata, which was operated by the Anglo–Dutch Billiton mining company. Despite these spectacular means, only one gold bar was raised on this occasion, along with 8 gold and 123 silver coins, 13 tons of steel, 3 tons of lead, 18 cubic meters of wreck wood, 5 cannons and some other objects. The expedition, which cost Billiton 442,500 Dutch guilders, brought a return of only 189,035.

In 1956, the Dutch engineer van Wienen proposed the construction of a vast floating pontoon (35 meters in diameter) to explore up to 10 meters deep in the sand while following the path of the shipwrecked ship from its stranding to its dislocation. But funding is not found for this ambitious project of 1.5 million guilders and its "plunging saucer" remains at the project stage 36.

In 1979, at the request of New Zealand underwater treasure hunters Lyle Henry Mortmore and Kelly Tarlton37, a tracking campaign is led by the company Oretech, which locates more than 4,000 objects using the latest information technologies. This makes it possible to establish with precision what was the trajectory of the Lutine in perdition. The following year, an American supply ship, the Yak,equipped with two large turbines to evacuate large quantities of sand by the pressure of the jet, was leased. While this method has proven itself in other cases of sandblasted wrecks, and despite the advanced technology that has been used for spotting, this new yard is another disappointment. The turbines dig wells 25 meters in diameter and eight meters deep in the space of half an hour, but only various debris, anchors and a fragment of pipe lost by a dredge during a previous site are recovered. The fact that these discoveries belonged to the Lutine could not be guaranteed, but they were shipped to New Zealand where Kelly Tarlton exhibited them as coming from the Lutine in her wreck museum in Waitangi.

The Lloyd's Act 1871
A brief history of the loss and salvage attempts is given in the preamble to the Lloyd's Act 1871:

The ownership of the remaining, unsalved, gold is vested in half shares between the 'decretal salvors' and the Society of Lloyd's, Lloyd's ownership being governed under the terms of the Lloyd's Act 1871, §35:

The Lutine Bell

The ship's bell (engraved "ST. JEAN – 1779") was recovered on 17 July 1858. The bell was found entangled in the chains originally running from the ship's wheel to the rudder, and was originally left in this state before being separated and re-hung from the rostrum of the Underwriting Room at Lloyd's. It remains a mystery why the name on the bell does not correspond with that of the ship. The bell was traditionally struck when news of an overdue ship arrived – once for the loss of a ship (i.e. bad news), and twice for her return (i.e. good news). The bell was sounded to stop the transaction of business while all brokers and underwriters were made aware of the news simultaneously. This was because reinsurance on an overdue vessel was often placed (so that an underwriter could close their books on a block of older business), so making the latest information on a ship highly material to a partly placed reinsurance contract. The bell has developed a crack and the traditional practice of ringing news has ended: the last time it was rung to tell of a lost ship was in 1979 and the last time it was rung to herald the return of an overdue ship was in 1989.

During World War II, the Nazi radio propagandist Lord Haw-Haw asserted that the bell was being rung continuously because of Allied shipping losses during the Battle of the Atlantic.

It tolls when a member of the Royal Family dies and was heard after the deaths of Diana, Princess of Wales, His Royal Highness The Prince Philip, Duke of Edinburgh, Queen Elizabeth The Queen Mother, and Queen Elizabeth II. It is now rung for ceremonial purposes to commemorate disasters such as the 9/11 disaster, the Asian tsunami, and the London Bombings, and is always rung at the start and end of the two minutes silence on Armistice Day. It was rung once after the death of Richard Rogers, architect of the present Lloyd's building.

The bell has hung in four successive Lloyd's Underwriting Rooms:

 The Royal Exchange 1859 – 1928;
 Lloyd's building in Leadenhall Street 1928–1958;
 Lloyd's first Lime Street headquarters 1958–1986;
 The present Lloyd's building in Lime Street since 1986.

There is also a chair and table at Lloyd's made from the frigate's rudder. The rudder was salvaged on 18 September 1858. This furniture was previously in the Lloyd's writing room and was used by the Chairman of Lloyd's at the annual general meeting of members, but is now kept in the Old Library of the Lloyd's building.

See also
 For a frigate's rigging see sail plan
 Blessing of Burntisland

Notes, citations, and references
Notes

Citations

References
 
 
 

 

External links

External links
 

Frigates of the Royal Navy
Ships of the French Navy
Age of Sail frigates of France
Treasure from shipwrecks
Shipwrecks of the Netherlands
Magicienne-class frigates
1779 ships
Ships built in France
Maritime incidents in 1799
Captured ships